Martin may refer to:

Places
 Martin City (disambiguation)
 Martin County (disambiguation)
 Martin Township (disambiguation)

Antarctica
 Martin Peninsula, Marie Byrd Land
 Port Martin, Adelie Land
 Point Martin, South Orkney Islands

Australia
 Martin, Western Australia
 Martin Place, Sydney

Caribbean
 Martin, Saint-Jean-du-Sud, Haiti, a village in the Sud Department of Haiti

Europe
 Martin, Croatia, a village in Slavonia, Croatia
 Martin, Slovakia, a city
 Martín del Río, Aragón, Spain
 Martin (Val Poschiavo), Switzerland

England
 Martin, Hampshire
 Martin, Kent
 Martin, East Lindsey, Lincolnshire, hamlet and former parish in East Lindsey district
 Martin, North Kesteven, village and parish in Lincolnshire in North Kesteven district
 Martin Hussingtree, Worcestershire
 Martin Mere, a lake in Lancashire
 WWT Martin Mere, a wetland nature reserve that includes the lake and surrounding areas
 Martin Mill, Kent

North America

Canada
 Rural Municipality of Martin No. 122, Saskatchewan, Canada
 Martin Islands, Nunavut, Canada

United States
 Martin, Florida
 Martin, Georgia
 Martin, Indiana
 Martin, Kentucky
 Martin, Louisiana
 Martin, Michigan
 Martin, Nebraska
 Martin, North Dakota
 Martin, Ohio
 Martin, South Carolina
 Martin, South Dakota
 Martin, Tennessee
 Martin, Washington
 Martin, West Virginia

People

 Martin (name)
 Martin (magister militum per Armeniam), East Roman general
 Martin Hoberg Hedegaard, Danish singer also known by his mononym Martin
 Masayuki Suzuki, a Japanese singer nicknamed Martin
 Martin Svensson (singer), Swedish singer also known by his mononym Martin
 FitzMartin, mediaeval English dynasty, later called Martin

Arts, entertainment, and media
 Martin (1977 film), a 1977 film directed by George A. Romero
 Martin (Konkani film), a 2017 film shown at the 8th Jagran Film Festival
 Martin (2023 film), an upcoming Indian Kannada-language film
 "Martin" (Tom Robinson song), a 1978 song by the Tom Robinson Band included on the 1981 album Tom Robinson Band
 "Martin", a song on the album The Art of Falling Apart by Soft Cell
 Martin (play), a 1972 television play written by Alasdair Gray
 Martin (TV series), an American situation comedy (1992–1997) produced by actor and comedian Martin Lawrence

Boats
Martin 16, a Canadian sailboat design for disabled sailers
Martin 29, a Canadian sailboat design

Brands and enterprises
 Aston Martin, an automobile manufacturer
 C. F. Martin & Company, a guitar company
 Glenn L. Martin Company, aircraft manufacturer, later Martin Marietta and finally merged into Lockheed Martin
  Martin Audio, an audio equipment company, now a susidiary of Focusrite
 Martin Band Instrument Company, a musical instrument manufacturer in Elkhart, Indiana
 Martin Professional, a lighting equipment manufacturer
 Martin Randall Travel, a cultural tour operator
 Martin-Baker, manufacturer of airline safety equipment

Other uses 
 Martin (bird), several species of birds in the swallow family Hirundinidae
 Martin Stadium, outdoor athletic stadium in Pullman, Washington
 Martín River, a tributary of the Ebro river in Spain
 Hurricane Martin, a tropical storm in 2022

See also
 
 Justice Martin (disambiguation)
 Martin's (disambiguation)
 Martin Company (disambiguation)
 Martin Field (disambiguation)
 Marten, one of several species of carnivorous mammal
 Martian
 Martine (disambiguation)
 Marton (disambiguation)
 Martyn (surname), one of the fourteen Tribes of Galway, Ireland
 St. Martin (disambiguation)
 St. Martin's (disambiguation)